"RIRURA RIRUHA [リルラ リルハ]" (also known as "Real Life Real Heart") is the third single by Japanese pop singer Kaela Kimura, and the first from her album Circle. Released March 30, 2005, it peaked at number three on the Japan Oricon singles chart, Kimura's highest charting single to date. By the end of 2005, Real Life Real Heart had sold 117,299 copies.

Track listing
"RIRURA RIRUHA [リルラ リルハ]"
"Twinkle"
"RIRURA RIRUHA [リルラ リルハ]" (Instrumental)
"Twinkle" (Instrumental)

Covers versions
 A cover version of "Rirura Riruha" appeared in Moero! Nekketsu Rhythm Damashii Osu! Tatakae! Ouendan 2, a rhythm game for the Nintendo DS.
 Mayako Nigo sang this song in character as Yayoi Takatsuki from The Idolmaster in one of Yayoi's solo albums.

References

2005 singles
Kaela Kimura songs
Japanese-language songs
Song articles with missing songwriters
2005 songs